The Cassville Post Office, at 1813 Cassville Rd. (Old Dixie Hwy.) in Cassville, Georgia, was built in 1889.  It was listed on the National Register of Historic Places in 1992.

Its front has clapboard siding;  its sides and rear have board-and-batten yellow pine siding.

By 2014 it was a museum, the Cassville Museum.  The museum, operated by the Cassville Historical Society, has closed.

References

1889 establishments in Georgia (U.S. state)
Buildings and structures completed in 1889
National Register of Historic Places in Bartow County, Georgia
Defunct museums in Georgia (U.S. state)